Mike Wirll (born February 28, 1982) is a Canadian former professional ice hockey right winger.

Wirll spent the majority of his career playing for several teams in the ECHL. He also played in the SM-liiga in Finland for JYP Jyväskylä and in the Elite Ice Hockey League in the United Kingdom for Scottish teams the Braehead Clan and the Dundee Stars.

Career statistics

References

External links

1982 births
Bakersfield Condors (1998–2015) players
Braehead Clan players
Brandon Wheat Kings players
Canadian ice hockey right wingers
Cincinnati Cyclones (ECHL) players
Charlotte Checkers (1993–2010) players
Dundee Stars players
Ice hockey people from Saskatchewan
Jacksonville Barracudas (SPHL) players
Jacksonville Barracudas (WHA2) players
JYP Jyväskylä players
Lethbridge Hurricanes players
Living people
Mississippi Sea Wolves players
Pensacola Ice Pilots players
Prince Albert Raiders players
Prince George Cougars players
EV Regensburg players
Sportspeople from Regina, Saskatchewan
Tulsa Oilers (1992–present) players
Utah Grizzlies (ECHL) players
Victoria Salmon Kings players
Canadian expatriate ice hockey players in Germany
Canadian expatriate ice hockey players in Scotland
Canadian expatriate ice hockey players in Finland
Canadian expatriate ice hockey players in the United States
Canadian expatriate ice hockey players in Sweden